Hennaarderadeel is a former municipality in the Dutch province of Friesland, southwest of Leeuwarden. Since 1984, the area has been a part of the municipality of Littenseradiel.

Some of the larger villages in Hennaarderadeel are Wommels and Easterein.

Former municipalities of Friesland